Melissa Kremer (26 January 1996 –  March 2021) was a Dutch author, who died from acute leukemia. Her book, Mijn kwaadbloed, became a Dutch bestseller. Its presales were unparalleled in popularity.

Melissa Kremer grew up in Hoorn. She received national media attention late 2020 by the way she spoke about having leukemia on her Instagram account. She was in several national television talk shows, including . She became even more famous after publishing her book My Bad Blood with a selection of stories and poems from her blog. The book was already a bestseller in the pre-sale. After the first print sold out, a second print will be out early April 2021.

The Dutch Police held an event on the central Dam Square in support of Kremer. Kremer died in March 2021, aged 25, from acute leukemia.

References

External links 
 Website and blog

21st-century Dutch non-fiction writers
Dutch women writers
1996 births
2021 deaths
People from Hoorn
Place of death missing
Deaths from leukemia
Dutch bloggers
Dutch women bloggers
Dutch women poets
21st-century Dutch poets
Dutch video bloggers
Women video bloggers
Writers from Amsterdam
Deaths from cancer in the Netherlands